The Gene Siskel Film Center, formerly The Film Center of the School of the Art Institute of Chicago and commonly referred to as The Film Center or The Gene Siskel, is the cinematheque attached to The School of the Art Institute of Chicago. It is named after popular film critic Gene Siskel.

Along with Doc Films at the University of Chicago and the Block Museum of Northwestern University, the Film Center is one of Chicago's key revival houses, and hosts at least one major retrospective per month. Unlike Doc or Block, the Film Center also serves as a venue for first runs of foreign and independent films and is not student-run. Amongst other things, this means the Film Center maintains a year-round staff and does not cease operation when The School of the Art Institute closes for semester breaks.

The Film Center reportedly averages 1,500 screenings a year.

History
The Film Center was founded as The Film Center of the School of the Art Institute of Chicago in 1972. It moved to its current location, 164 N State St. in the Chicago Loop neighborhood of Chicago, in June 2001; the Film Center was officially renamed during the move. The current location is directly across the street from the Chicago Theatre and directly south of the ABC Building, where Siskel & Ebert and successor series Ebert & Roeper recorded weekly from 1996 until 2008.

Its current facilities, which consist of two theaters capable of projecting most formats, are considered state-of-the-art.

References

External links
Official website

Cinemas and movie theaters in Chicago
Film organizations in the United States
Gene Siskel
Siskel and Ebert